Flugestone (INN, BAN), also known as flurogestone, as well as 9α-fluoro-11β,17α-dihydroxyprogesterone, is a steroidal progestin of the 17α-hydroxyprogesterone group that was never marketed. An acetate ester, flurogestone acetate, is used in veterinary medicine.

See also
 9α-Bromo-11-ketoprogesterone
 Fluorometholone
 Medrysone
 Norgestomet

References

Glucocorticoids
Halohydrins
Organofluorides
Pregnanes
Progestogens